Sarab-e Baba Ali (also Romanized as Sarāb-e Bābā ‘Alī and Sarāb Bāba ‘Ali; also known as Sarāt-e Bābā ‘Alī) is a village in Khezel-e Gharbi Rural District, in the Central District of Kangavar County, Kermanshah Province, Iran. At the 2006 census, its population was 85, in 15 families.

References 

Populated places in Kangavar County